Catocala louiseae, or Louise's underwing, is a moth of the family Erebidae. The epithet, louiseae, is in honor of "the late Louise (Mrs. E.P.) Mellon" who funded the Carnegie Museum of Natural History expedition on which the type specimen was collected. The species was first described by John Bauer in 1965.

Distribution
It is found in the US from North Carolina south to Florida and west through Arkansas to Texas.

Description
The wingspan is about 40 mm.

Life cycle
Adults are on wing in May. There is probably one generation per year.

The larvae feed on Vaccinium arboreum and probably other blueberries.

Taxonomy
Catocala louiseae is given precedence per Article 23.9.2 as a nomen protectum over its disused senior subjective synonym Catocala protonympha, which becomes a nomen oblitum.

References

 Gall, L.F. & D.C. Hawks. 2001 [2002a]. Precedence of Catocala louiseae Bauer, 1965 as a nomen protectum over Catocala protonympha Boisduval, 1840 (Noctuidae). Journal of the Lepidopterists' Society 55:171-174.

External links
Species info

louiseae
Moths described in 1965
Moths of North America